The Canyon Dam  is a large arch-gravity dam built across the Maskeliya Oya,  upstream of the iconic Laxapana Falls, in the Central Province of Sri Lanka. The associated power station plays a major role in the national power grid, due to its significant output.
The dam is surrounded by steel structures of the  substation.

Reservoir and power station 

The reservoir's primary source of water is the Maskeliya Oya, with additional water discharged from the Canyon HPower Station, located at the same site.

See also 
 List of dams and reservoirs in Sri Lanka
 List of power stations in Sri Lanka

References 

1974 establishments in Sri Lanka
Arch-gravity dams
Buildings and structures in Nuwara Eliya District
Dams completed in 1974
Dams in Sri Lanka
Hydroelectric power stations in Sri Lanka